Joe Winters was a 20-year-old African-American man who was lynched in Conroe, Montgomery County, Texas by a mob on May 20, 1922. According to the United States Senate Committee on the Judiciary it was the 27th of 61 lynchings during 1922 in the United States.

Background

A 14-year-old girl was allegedly assaulted on Friday, 4:00 PM, May 19, 1920, near Leonidas, Texas. Rudolph Manning was initially rounded up and smuggled to Houston, Texas by his employer W.H. Biggers, M.A. Anderson, former sheriff of Montgomery County and J.W. Baker but present day Montgomery Sheriff Hicks brought him back to Conroe and then to Leonidas where the victim said it wasn't him. 

A large crowd gathered in Conroe and rumours swirled that a new suspect, Joe Winters, had taken a horse near Waukegan, Texas. He was spotted  from Waukegan on his way to Youens, Texas. Police arrested him at 2:00 PM on Saturday, May 20, 1922, and he was taken to Leonidas where the victim was allegedly able to identify him.

Lynching
Since the alleged attack, local newspapers had been calling for a crowd to gather and by the time of the positive identification thousands of people had gathered in Conroe, Texas. When Montgomery Sheriff Hicks returned to Conroe, he was quickly overpowered and the mob seized Winters and chained him to an iron post in courthouse square, where he had oil boxes stacked around him. The pile was ignited and he was burned alive proclaiming his innocence.

See also
List of lynching victims in the United States

Bibliography 
Notes
 

 
  

1922 riots
1922 in Texas
African-American history of Texas
Lynching deaths in Texas 
February 1922 events
Protest-related deaths
Racially motivated violence against African Americans 
Riots and civil disorder in Texas 
White American riots in the United States